Socialist self-management or self-governing socialism was a form of workers' self-management used as a social and economic model formulated by the Communist Party of Yugoslavia. It was instituted by law in 1950 and lasted in the Socialist Federal Republic of Yugoslavia until 1990, just prior to its breakup in 1992.

The main goal was to move the managing of companies into the hands of workers and to separate the management from the state and it was further solidified by law in the 1974 Yugoslav Constitution. It was also meant to demonstrate the viability of a third way between the capitalist United States and the socialist Soviet Union.

Based on market-based allocation, social ownership of the means of production and self-management within firms, this system substituted for Yugoslavia's former Soviet-type central planning.

History

As President of Yugoslavia, Josip Broz Tito prided himself on Yugoslavia's independence from the Soviet Union, with Yugoslavia never accepting full membership in Comecon and Tito's open rejection of many aspects of Stalinism as the most obvious manifestations of this. The Soviets and their satellite states often accused Yugoslavia of Trotskyism and social democracy, charges loosely based on Tito's form of workers' self-management and the theory of associated labor (profit sharing policies and worker-owned industries initiated by him, Milovan Đilas and Edvard Kardelj in 1950). It was in these things that the Soviet leadership accused of harboring the seeds of council communism or even corporatism.

In 1948, the Communist Party of Yugoslavia held its Fifth Congress. The meeting was held shortly after Stalin accused Tito of being a nationalist and moving to the right branding his heresy Titoism. This resulted in a break with the Soviet Union known as the Informbiro period. Initially the Yugoslav communists, despite the break with Stalin, remained as hard line as before but soon began to pursue a policy of independent socialism that experimented with the self-management of workers in state-run enterprises, with decentralization and other departures from the Soviet model of a Communist state.

Under the influence of reformers such as Boris Kidrič and Milovan Đilas, Yugoslavia experimented with ideas of workers self-management where workers influenced the policies of the factories in which they worked and shared a portion of any surplus revenue. This resulted in a change in the party's role in society from holding a monopoly of power to being an ideological leader. As a result, the party name and the names of the regional branches respectively were changed to the League of Communists of Yugoslavia (SKJ) in 1952 during its Sixth Congress.

Criticism
The top-down nature of the workers' councils however led to corruption, cynicism and inefficiencies until they were abolished during the Yugoslav Wars.

By 1989, Ante Marković's reform government abolished self-management. At this time, the country had crippling foreign debt, structural adjustment measures enforced by the International Monetary Fund, and economic collapse amplified the centrifugal pulls of foreign markets.

References

See also
 Socialism with a human face

Anarchist theory
Communism
Cooperatives
Economic systems
Self-management
Management by type
Market socialism
Marxian economics
Marxism
Political philosophy
Political theories
Recovered factories
Socialism
Syndicalism